Charlie Burg (born September 19, 1996) is an American singer-songwriter and producer. In 2015, Burg released a mixtape, Blue Wave Mosaic, then went on to release a series of extended plays from 2016 to 2019. In 2022, Burg released his debut album Infinitely Tall.

Early life and education 
Burg was born in Detroit, Michigan. He was brought up in a Jewish household, frequently wears a Magen David pendant, and has cited singing in Synagogue as an early exposure to music. He attended Seaholm High School, then Denison University for his freshman year of college, before transferring to Michigan State University's Residential College in Arts and Humanities, where he studied humanities and English. After his sophomore year, he transferred again to the Setnor School of Music at Syracuse University to major in music industry.

Artistry 
Burg describes his music as R&B/indie rock. He cites early influences to his music as Al Green, Marvin Gaye, and The Temptations. Burg was inspired by Ralph Waldo Emerson's poems in his newest extended plays.

Discography

Albums 

 Infinitely Tall (2022)

Mixtapes 

 Blue Wave Mosaic (2015)

EPs 

 Live in Peter’s Attic (2016)
 One, Violet (2017)
 Two, Moonlight (2018)
 Three, Fever (2019)

Singles 
 "Tha Breeze, Tha Steeze, Palm Trees"
 "Channel Orange In Your Living Room"
 "Lancaster Nights"
 "Title Guide to the Talkies"
 "97 Avalon"
 "Break The Rhythm"
 "Chicago (Take It Or Leave It)"
 "Ooh! Sumthin' New"

References 

Living people
Syracuse University alumni
Singers from Detroit
American male singer-songwriters
21st-century American male writers
21st-century American male singers
21st-century American singers
1998 births
Singer-songwriters from Michigan